Fabrício do Rosário dos Santos (born 8 October 2000), simply known as Fabrício, is a Brazilian professional footballer who plays as a forward for Spanish club CD Castellón, on loan from Levante UD.

Club career

Brasil de Pelotas
Born in Cachoeira do Sul, Brazil, Fabrício joined Brasil de Pelotas' youth sides in 2018, from São Paulo-RS. He made his first team debut with the former on 10 February 2019, coming on as a late substitute in a 3–1 Campeonato Gaúcho home loss against Aimoré.

Fabrício made his Campeonato Brasileiro Série B debut in the match against Londrina on 4 May 2019.

Grêmio
Fabrício joined the Grêmio's Academy at the age of 18 in 2019; initially on loan, he signed a permanent contract with the club in February 2020. He made his first team debut on 7 September 2020, replacing Isaque late into a 1–1 away draw against Atlético Goianiense.

On 30 April 2021, after being already out of the first team squad, Fabrício returned to his former side Brasil on loan until the end of the year. On 27 August, however, he moved abroad and joined Spanish Primera División RFEF club Celta de Vigo B on a one-year loan deal.

Levante
On 29 August 2022, Fabrício signed a five-year contract with Segunda División side Levante UD, and was immediately loaned out to third division club CD Castellón for the 2022–23 season.

Career statistics

Club

Honours
Grêmio
Campeonato Gaúcho: 2020, 2021

References

External links

Profile at the Brasil de Pelotas website

2000 births
Living people
Sportspeople from Rio Grande do Sul
Brazilian footballers
Association football forwards
Campeonato Brasileiro Série A players
Campeonato Brasileiro Série B players
Grêmio Foot-Ball Porto Alegrense players
Grêmio Esportivo Brasil players
Primera Federación players
Celta de Vigo B players
Levante UD footballers
CD Castellón footballers
Brazilian expatriate footballers
Brazilian expatriate sportspeople in Spain
Expatriate footballers in Spain